Besik Lezhava (born February 21, 1986) is a Georgian basketball player for Titebi and the Georgian national team, where he participated at the EuroBasket 2015.

References

1986 births
Living people
Shooting guards
Basketball players from Tbilisi
Men's basketball players from Georgia (country)